The 1941 Brownlow Medal was the 18th year the award was presented to the player adjudged the fairest and best player during the Victorian Football League (VFL) home and away season. Norman Ware of the Footscray Football Club won the medal by polling twenty-three votes during the 1941 VFL season.

Leading votegetters 
* The player was ineligible to win the medal due to suspension by the VFL Tribunal during the year.

References 

1941 in Australian rules football
1941